Saimir Malko (born 17 March 1970) is an Albanian retired footballer who played for KS Lushnja, Partizani Tirana, Dinamo Tirana, KF Tirana and Flamurtari Vlorë.

Playing career

International
He made his debut for Albania in a May 1994 friendly match away against Macedonia and earned a total of 15 caps, scoring no goals. His final international was a December 1996 FIFA World Cup qualification match away against Northern Ireland.

Managerial career
After stints in charge of Lushnja and Kamza, Malko was appointed manager of Besëlidhja in December 2012.

Honours
Albanian Superliga: 3
 1995, 1996, 1999

References

External links

1970 births
Living people
Sportspeople from Lushnjë
Albanian footballers
Albania international footballers
Albania under-21 international footballers
Association football defenders
KS Lushnja players
FK Partizani Tirana players
FK Dinamo Tirana players
KF Tirana players
Flamurtari Vlorë players
Kategoria Superiore players
Albanian football managers
KS Lushnja managers
FC Kamza managers
Besëlidhja Lezhë managers
Kategoria Superiore managers